The non-marine molluscs of Pakistan are a part of the fauna of Pakistan. They include land and freshwater gastropods and freshwater bivalves.

Freshwater gastropods 

Viviparidae
 Bellamya bengalensis (Lamarck 1822)

Thiaridae
 Melanoides tuberculata (Muller, 1774)

Lymnaeidae
 Lymnaea acuminata f. rufescens (Gray, 1820)
 Lymnaea acuminata f. chlamys (Benson, 1836)
 Lymnaea auricularia (Linnaeus, 1758)
 Lymnaea luteola (Lamarck, 1822)

Physidae
 Physa acuta (Draparnaud, 1805)
 Physa gyrina (Say, 1821)

Planorbidae
 Gyraulus convexiusculus (Hutton, 1849)
 Indoplanorbis exustus (Deshayes, 1834)

Land gastropods 

Chondrinidae
 Granaria lapidaria (Hutton, 1849)

Gastrocoptidae
 Boysia boysii (L. Pfeiffer, 1846)
 Boysidia tamtouriana Pokryszko, Auffenberg, Hlaváč & Naggs, 2009
 Gastrocopta avanica (Benson, 1863)
 Gastrocopta huttoniana (Benson, 1849)
 Gastrocopta klunzingeri (Jickeli, 1873)

Pupillidae
 Pupilla annandalei Pilsbry
 Pupilla khunjerabica Pokryszko, Auffenberg, Hlaváč & Naggs, 2009
 Pupilla muscorum (Linnaeus, 1758)
 Pupilla paraturcmenica Pokryszko, Auffenberg, Hlaváč & Naggs, 2009
 Pupilla satparanica Pokryszko, Auffenberg, Hlaváč & Naggs, 2009
 Pupilla signata (Mousson)
 Pupilla turcmenia (O. Boettger)
 Pupilla ziaratana Pokryszko, Auffenberg, Hlaváč & Naggs, 2009

Truncatellinidae
 Columella nymphaepratensis Pokryszko, Auffenberg, Hlaváč & Naggs, 2009
 Truncatellina ayubiana Pokryszko, Auffenberg, Hlaváč & Naggs, 2009
 Truncatellina babusarica Pokryszko, Auffenberg, Hlaváč & Naggs, 2009
 Truncatellina callicratis (Scacchi, 1833)
 Truncatellina himalayana (Benson, 1863)

Vertiginidae
 Vertigo antivertigo (Draparnaud, 1801)
 Vertigo nangaparbatensis Pokryszko, Auffenberg, Hlaváč & Naggs, 2009
 Vertigo pseudosubstriata Ložek, 1954
 Vertigo superstriata Pokryszko, Auffenberg, Hlaváč & Naggs, 2009

Clausiliidae
 Cylindrophaedusa farooqi (Auffenberg & Fakhri, 1995)

Parmacellidae
 Candaharia rutellum (Hutton, 1849)

Agriolimacidae
 Deroceras laeve (O. F. Müller, 1774)

Anadenidae
 Anadenus altivagus (Theobald, 1862)

Camaenidae
 Pseudiberus chitralensis (Odhner, 1963)

Freshwater bivalves

See also
List of marine molluscs of Pakistan
List of non-marine molluscs of Afghanistan
List of non-marine molluscs of Iran
List of non-marine molluscs of India
List of non-marine molluscs of China
List of non-marine molluscs of Tajikistan

References

Further reading 
 Auffenberg K. (1997). "The biogeography of the land snails of Pakistan". pp. 253–275. In: Mufti S. A., Woods, C. A. &  Hasan S. A. (eds). Biodiversity of Pakistan. Pakistan Museum of Natural History, Islamabad and Florida Museum of Natural History, Gainesville.

M

Molluscs
Pakistan
Pakistan